Mound Cemetery, Cemetery Mound, or Mound Cemetery Site may refer to:
McLaughlin Mound, also called Cemetery Mound, Mount Vernon, Ohio
Mound Cemetery (Marietta, Ohio)
Mound Cemetery (Arkansas City, Arkansas)
Mound Cemetery Mound (Chester, Ohio)

See also 
 Borre mound cemetery
 Indian Mound Cemetery